This is a list of the Dutch Top 40 number-one singles of 2010.
The Dutch Top 40 is a chart that ranks the best-performing singles of the Netherlands. It is published by radio station Radio 538.

In 2010, 12 acts gained their first Dutch number-one single either as lead or featured act: Owl City, Train, B.o.B, Bruno Mars, Stromae, Yolanda Be Cool, DCUP, Travie McCoy, Swedish House Mafia, Pharrell, Cee Lo Green and Mohombi.
That means all of the acts who became number one this year got their first Dutch number-one single.

Bruno Mars got his first number-one single as a featured artist in "Nothin' On You" for two weeks, his second again as a featured artist in "Billionaire" for one week, and his third as his first single as a lead artist in "Just the Way You Are" for 11 straight weeks.
The last time that an act was number-one for 11 weeks was in 2007, when André Hazes and Gerard Joling became number-one for 11 weeks with "Blijf Bij Mij". The last time an artist had three number-one singles in one year happened in 2006, when Marco Borsato hit the number-one position with Because We Believe featuring Andrea Bocelli, Rood and Everytime I Think of You featuring Lucie Silvas.

It is the first time that the Dutch Top 40 only got 10 number-one singles in one year, and the third time (after 1988 and 1990) that there were no Dutch number one-singles.

This year, there were two singles that held the number-one position for just one week (Billionaire and Bumpy Ride), which has not happened since 2007.

Chart history

Number-one artists

See also
2010 in music
List of number-one hits (Netherlands)

References

Dutch Top 40
Netherlands
2010